Logan Wilde (born March 27, 1976) is an American politician who served in the Utah House of Representatives from the 53rd district from 2017 to 2020 when he resigned.

References

1976 births
Living people
Republican Party members of the Utah House of Representatives
21st-century American politicians